Mosaic Communications, also known as Moscom, or as Mozcom, was the first commercial internet service provider in the Philippines, established in 1994.

On April 17, 2015, remaining Mozcom subscribers received notice that their accounts would be migrated to Tri-Isys Internet effective April 30, 2015 on account of the business closure of Mozcom.

References

Internet service providers of the Philippines
Telecommunications companies established in 1994
Telecommunications companies of the Philippines
Companies based in Makati
2015 disestablishments in the Philippines